These are Hindu Brahmins who affiliate either with the Gautam gotra and/or Gautam Dharmasutra and have their last name as Gautam.

Etymology
The name Gautam (Sanskrit: गौतम, a vrddhi patronymic of Gotama and also transliterated as Gautama or Gauthama) is one of the ancient Indian names and is derived from the Sanskrit roots  गः gaḥ and तम tama. Tama means “darkness” and gaḥ means inter alia "bright light". Together they indicate the one, who dispels darkness (i.e., ignorance) by his brilliance (i.e., spiritual knowledge).

Generally some Brahmins who affiliate either with the Gautam gotra and/or Gautam Dharmasutra . in the states of Haryana, Rajasthan, Western Uttar Pradesh, Himachal Pradesh, Karnataka and Tamilnadu write the last name as Gautam.

Notable people
Dhwani Gautam, Indian filmmaker
Laxmi Gautam, Indian academic and professor of philosophy
Navneet Gautam, Indian kabbadi player
Mukesh Gautam, Indian film director and father of Surilie and Yami Gautam
Ram Kumar Gautam, Indian politician
Rashmi Gautam, Indian actress
Ravindra Gautam, Indian film and television director
 Satish Kumar Gautam, Indian politician
Shatrughan Gautam, Indian politician
Sheela Gautam, Indian politician
Srikant Gautam, Indian lyricist and film director
Surilie Gautam, Indian film and television actress
Umesh Gautam, Indian politician
Yami Gautam, Indian actress

Notes

Brahmins